Roh Tae-hyun (Hangul: 노태현; born October 15, 1993), is a South Korean singer and dancer. He is a former member of Hotshot and JBJ. He released his debut solo extended play, Birthday, on January 24, 2019. He participated as a member of Mbitious in Street Man Fighter.

Discography

Extended plays

Singles

As lead artist

References

External links

1993 births
Kakao M artists
Living people
Produce 101 contestants
South Korean male idols
21st-century South Korean  male singers
People from Seoul
Singers from Seoul